Duan Tianjie is a major general in the People's Liberation Army (PLA). He was placed under investigation by PLA's anti-corruption agency in November 2014 and transferred to the military judicial organ in January 2015. Previously he served as deputy director of the Political Department of PLA National Defence University.

Duan Tianjie was also a columnist in Liberation Army Daily, and he once served as president of Zhanyou Bao.

References

Living people
People's Liberation Army generals from Shanxi
Year of birth missing (living people)